A special election was held in  on June 7, 1814, to fill a vacancy left by the resignation of Reasin Beall (DR) to accept an appointment to the Federal Land Office in Wooster, Ohio.

Election results

Clendenin took office on December 22

See also
List of special elections to the United States House of Representatives

References

Special elections to the 13th United States Congress
Ohio 1814 06
Ohio 06